Edinburg is an unincorporated community in Lawrence County, Pennsylvania, United States. Edinburg has a post office with ZIP code 16116.

References

Unincorporated communities in Lawrence County, Pennsylvania
Unincorporated communities in Pennsylvania